Krimmer is a surname. Notable people with the surname include:

Robert Krimmer (born 1953), American lawyer and actor
Sebastian Krimmer (born 1990), German gymnast